Tirstrup is a town in East Jutland, Denmark. As of 1 January 2022, the town has a population of 475.

Tirstrup is located 44 kilometers from Aarhus and 18 kilometers from Grenaa. The town is a home to Aarhus Airport. Tirstrup lies in the Syddjurs Municipality and is governed as part of the Central Denmark Region (Region Midtjylland).

Footnotes 

Cities and towns in the Central Denmark Region